Glass Blowers of Murano is a late 19th-century painting by American artist Charles Frederic Ulrich. Done in oil on wood, the work depicts a glassblowing foundry in Murano, Italy, which was famed for its glass. The painting is in the collection of the Metropolitan Museum of Art.

References

Paintings in the collection of the Metropolitan Museum of Art
1886 paintings
American paintings